Nice-Ville station (French: Gare de Nice-Ville), also known as Nice-Thiers station (Gare de Nice-Thiers), is the main railway station of Nice, France. It is situated on the Marseille–Ventimiglia railway and constitutes the southwestern terminus of the Nice–Breil-sur-Roya railway. Nice-Ville is served by TER, Intercités and TGV services, as well as the Gare Thiers stop on Line 1 of the Nice tramway.

Overview
The station was opened in 1864 and completed in 1867 for the Chemins de fer de Paris à Lyon et à la Méditerranée (PLM) by architect Louis-Jules Bouchot in Louis XIII style.

Nice Ville was built away from the centre although Nice has now extended around the station. The station has been remodelled several times but always kept its original style of Arles stone sculptures and forged steel rooftop. The passenger hall is richly decorated and shadowed by balconies and a big clock but has lost its grand chandeliers.

It has remained in its original condition since its opening, although modern equipment has been installed to welcome the arrival of the TGV Sud-Est. Before the arrival of the TGV, the station was host to several other prestigious express trains: Côte d'Azur Pullman Express, the Blue Train and the Mistral.

Train services
The station is served by the following services:

High speed services (TGV) Paris (– Marseille) – Cannes – Nice (– Monaco – Menton)
High speed services (TGV) Lyon – Avignon – Cannes – Nice
Regional services (TER Provence-Alpes-Côte d'Azur) Marseille – Toulon – Cannes – Nice
Local services (TER Provence-Alpes-Côte d'Azur) Cannes – Antibes – Nice – Monaco – Menton – Ventimiglia
Local services (TER Provence-Alpes-Côte d'Azur) Grasse – Cannes – Antibes – Nice – Monaco – Menton – Ventimiglia
Local services (TER Provence-Alpes-Cote d'Azur) Nice – Breil-sur-Roya – Tende

See also
Nice CP station
Gare du Sud
Nice-Riquier station
Nice-Saint-Augustin station

References

External links

Transport in Nice
Buildings and structures in Nice
Railway stations in Alpes-Maritimes
TER Provence-Alpes-Côte-d'Azur
Railway stations in France opened in 1867